Municipal elections were held in Montenegro on 30 August 2020 in Andrijevica, Budva, Gusinje, Kotor and Tivat.

Elections for the Tivat local parliament were scheduled for 24 April, but were postponed to August, due to the COVID-19 pandemic in Montenegro, so that elections in all five municipalities were held on 30 August, the same date as the national-level parliamentary elections.

Since parliamentary election resulted in a victory for the opposition parties and the fall from power of the ruling DPS, which had ruled the country since the introduction of the multi-party system in 1990. Opposition success at the national level was accompanied by its success at local level elections, opposition lists won majority in four out of five municipalities where elections were held, including Andrijevica, Budva, Kotor and Tivat while in Gusinje, the ruling DPS retained power, in coalition with SD and the national minority parties.

Results

Andrijevica

Budva

Gusinje

Kotor

Tivat

Notes

References

2020 in Montenegro
August 2020 events in Europe
Local elections in Montenegro
Montenegro